Ooni Adagba was the 36th Ooni of Ife, a paramount traditional ruler of Ile Ife, the ancestral home of the Yorubas. He succeeded Ooni Osinlade and was succeeded by  
Ooni Ojigidiri.

References

 Oonis of Ife
 Yoruba history